Lepitsa is a village in northwestern Bulgaria situated in the Cherven Bryag Municipality, Pleven Province. It has a population of 503  and has recently gained some fame through its football team FC Svetoslav founded in 2007 and funded by the population of the village.

Lepitsa Peak on Trinity Peninsula in Antarctica is named after the village.

References

Villages in Pleven Province